The 1978–79 Luxembourg National Division was the 65th season of top level association football in Luxembourg.

Overview
It was performed in 12 teams, and FA Red Boys Differdange won the championship.

League standings

Results

References
Luxembourg - List of final tables (RSSSF)

Luxembourg National Division seasons
Lux
1978–79 in Luxembourgian football